Vyzhnytsia Raion is an administrative raion (district) in the southern part of Chernivtsi Oblast, located in the historical region of Bukovina, in western Ukraine, on the Romanian border. Population: 

On 18 July 2020, as part of the administrative reform of Ukraine, the number of raions of Chernivtsi Oblast was reduced to three, and the area of Vyzhnytsia Raion was significantly expanded. One abolished raion, Putyla Raion, and a part of one more abolished raion, Kitsman Raion, were merged into Vyzhnytsia Raion.

Subdivisions

Current
After the reform in July 2020, the raion consisted of 9 hromadas:
 Banyliv rural hromada with the administration in the selo of Banyliv, retained from Vyzhnytsia Raion;
 Berehomet settlement hromada with the administration in the urban-type settlement of Berehomet, retained from Vyzhnytsia Raion;
 Brusnytsia rural hromada with the administration in the selo of Brusnytsia, transferred from Kitsman Raion;
 Koniatyn rural hromada with the administration in the selo of Koniatyn, transferred from Putyla Raion;
 Putyla settlement hromada with the administration in the urban-type settlement of Putyla, transferred from Putyla Raion;
 Seliatyn rural hromada with the administration in the selo of Seliatyn, transferred from Putyla Raion;
 Ust-Putyla rural hromada with the administration in the selo of Ust-Putyla, transferred from Putyla Raion;
 Vashkivtsi urban hromada with the administration in the city of Vashkivtsi, retained from Vyzhnytsia Raion;
 Vyzhnytsia urban hromada with the administration in the city of Vyzhnytsia, retained from Vyzhnytsia Raion.

Before 2020

Before the 2020 reform, the raion consisted of four hromadas:
 Banyliv rural hromada with the administration in Banyliv;
 Berehomet settlement hromada with the administration in Berehomet;
 Vashkivtsi urban hromada with the administration in Vashkivtsi;
 Vyzhnytsia urban hromada with the administration in Vyzhnytsia.

See also
Subdivisions of Ukraine

References

External links
 Web page on the website of Regional State Administration 

Raions of Chernivtsi Oblast
1940 establishments in Ukraine